This is a list of the members of the Australian House of Representatives in the Fourth Australian Parliament, which was elected on 13 April 1910.

Notes

* These candidates were elected unopposed.

  The Commonwealth Liberal Party, or the Fusion Party, was formed in 1909 when the Protectionist Party merged with the Free Trade Party.
  Lee Batchelor died in 1911, and was replaced by David Gordon (Commonwealth Liberal) at the resulting by-election on 11 November 1911.
  Henry Beard died in 1911, and was replaced by Frank Brennan (Labor) at the resulting by-election on 8 February 1911.
  Thomas Brown was first elected in 1901 to the Division of Canobolas, which was abolished at the 1906 redistribution.
  John Chanter was first elected in 1901, defeated at the 1903 election, but then re-elected at a by-election in 1904.
  George Edwards died in 1911, and was replaced by Granville Ryrie (Commonwealth Liberal) at the resulting by-election on 11 March 1911.
  George Edwards was first elected in 1901 to the Division of South Sydney, but retired before the 1906 election.
  James Fowler joined the Commonwealth Liberal Party in 1909 having previously been a Labor member.
  David Hall resigned in 1912, and was replaced by Benjamin Bennett (Labor) at the resulting by-election on 1 June 1912.
  William Higgs previously sat in the Australian Senate as a Senator for Queensland from 1901 to 1907.
  William Knox resigned in 1910, and was replaced by Sir Robert Best (Commonwealth Liberal) at the resulting by-election on 29 August 1910.
  Sir William Lyne stood as an independent, having previously been a member of the Protectionist Party.
  George Wise stood as an independent, having previously been a member of the Protectionist Party.

Members of Australian parliaments by term
20th-century Australian politicians